Brand New was an American rock band. The discography of the group consists of five studio albums, five extended plays, nine singles, and seven music videos.

The band released their first studio album, Your Favorite Weapon, in 2001. It has sold over 315,000 copies. In 2003, they released their second studio album, Deja Entendu. It is the only Brand New album to be certified gold in the US. Two singles from the album, "The Quiet Things That No One Ever Knows" and "Sic Transit Gloria... Glory Fades", charted in the US and the UK. Their third studio album, The Devil and God Are Raging Inside Me, was released in 2006. In 2009, Daisy, their fourth studio album, was released. Science Fiction, their fifth studio album, was released in 2017. It peaked at number 1 in the US.

Albums

Studio albums

Extended plays

Demos

Compilations

Singles

Promotional singles

Other appearances

Unreleased material

Demos

Songs

Live covers
All covers found at this reference:

Music videos

See also 
 List of songs recorded by Brand New

Notes

References

External links
Official website
Brand New discography at Discogs

Discography
Discographies of American artists
Rock music group discographies